The 1999 Insight.com Bowl was the 11th edition of the game. It featured the Colorado Buffaloes and the Boston College Eagles.

Game Summary

1st Quarter
Colorado started off with a 10-yard touchdown run from Cortlen Johnson thus making it 7–0 Colorado. Mike Moschetti's 2 yard touchdown run made it 14–0. Colorado's Jason Sykes intercepted a Boston College pass, and returned it 29 yards for a touchdown, making it 21-0 Colorado, to close the 1st quarter scoring.

2nd Quarter
In the second quarter, Colorado's Rashidi Barnes intercepted a Boston College pass, and returned it 21 yards for a touchdown, making it 28-0. Ben Kelly later scored on an 88-yard punt return for Colorado giving them a 35-0 lead. With Colorado driving again, Boston College's George White intercepted a Colorado pass and returned it 78 yards for a score making it 35–7. Cortlen Johnson added a 2-yard touchdown for Colorado to make it 42–7. Jeremy Aldrich's 26 yard field goal made it 45–7 Colorado at the half.

3rd Quarter
In the third quarter, Jeremy Aldrich drilled a 21-yard field goal, making the score 48–7 Colorado. Boston College's Bryan Ardnt recovered a fumble in the end zone to make it 48–14. Colorado's Roman Hollowell scored on an 18-yard touchdown run to make it 55–14 Colorado at the end of three quarters.

4th Quarter
Colorado's Zac Colvin rushed 4 yards for a touchdown to make it 62–14. Boston College's Tim Hasselbeck threw a 2-yard touchdown pass to Jamal Burke to make it 62–21. Doug Bessette scored on a 9-yard return of a blocked punt for Boston College, to make the final score 62–28.

Aftermath
Colorado's 62 points was an Insight Bowl record. Boston College won eight straight bowl games after this loss.

References

Insight.com Bowl
Guaranteed Rate Bowl
Colorado Buffaloes football bowl games
Boston College Eagles football bowl games
Sports in Tucson, Arizona
Insight.com Bowl
December 1999 sports events in the United States
Events in Tucson, Arizona